Mana Endo was the defending champion but did not compete that year.

Leila Meskhi won in the final 6–2, 6–3 against Fang Li.

Seeds
A champion seed is indicated in bold text while text in italics indicates the round in which that seed was eliminated.

 n/a
  Chanda Rubin (second round)
  Judith Wiesner (semifinals)
  Ginger Helgeson-Nielsen (first round)
  Leila Meskhi (champion)
  Larisa Neiland (first round)
  Irina Spîrlea (first round)
  Lisa Raymond (second round)

Draw

External links
 1995 Schweppes Tasmanian International Draw 

Hobart International – Singles
Sin